Sky Sport is a group of nine sports satellite TV channels in the Italian language produced and broadcast by Sky Italia.

Channels
 
The channel "Roma TV" is also included in the Sky Sport package.

Sky Sport 24
Sky Sport 24 is a sports all-news channel.  With 24 hour cycle, of which 14 & 1/2 hours of live content (10:00–00:30) and 9 & 1/2 hours of reruns (00:30–10:00), it broadcasts current event updates, press conferences and breaking news all related to sport. British equivalent is Sky Sports News.

Sky Sport Uno
Sky Sport Uno (until July 1, 2018, Sky Sport 1) is the flagship channel of Sky Sport, dedicated to major sporting events. The British equivalent was Sky Sports 1, however it is now Sky Sports Main Event after it was renamed.

Sky Sport Calcio
Sky Sport Calcio (Sky Sport Serie A until July 1, 2021, available only with the Sky Calcio pack) is a TV channel created for Serie A and Serie B matches rights. This channel is similar to the British, Sky Sports Premier League, equivalent.

Sky Sport Football
Sky Sport Football is the channel dedicated to non-Italian football. These are Sky Sport's Footballing rights used by this channel:
UEFA Competitions
UEFA Champions League (121 matches per season live until 2024)
UEFA Europa League (until 2024)
UEFA Europa Conference League (until 2024)
Country Leagues
Premier League (until 2025)
Bundesliga (until 2025)
2.Bundesliga (until 2025)
Ligue 1 (until 2024)
This channel has other equivalents in other countries Sky operates.

Sky Sport Arena
As with other equivalents in other countries, Sky Sport Arena is a multi-sport channel for other rights not covered or clashes by other Sky Sport channels.

These are some Sky Sport's rights used by this channel:
Basketball
 EuroBasket (2021)
 AfroBasket (2021)
 FIBA AmeriCup (2021)
 FIBA Asia Cup (2021)
Tennis
ATP World Tour Masters 1000 (until 2023)
ATP Finals (until 2023)
Wimbledon (until 2022)
Rugby union
The Rugby Championship
Currie Cup
Heineken Champions Cup
Challenge Cup
Wrestling
All Elite Wrestling
Sailing
America's Cup 
Handball
2021 World Championships
EHF Champions League 
2020 Women's European Championships
EHF Euro 2022
Athletics
Diamond League (except for the Golden Gala)
Continental Tour Gold 
Waterpolo
LEN Champions League
Volleyball
CEV Champions League
CEV Women's Champions League

Sky Sport Tennis
Sky Sport Tennis (known as Sky Sport Golf until July 21, 2019 and as Sky Sport Collection until June 28, 2021) is a channel dedicated to tennis, which airs Wimbledon tournament and other ATP tournaments, including Next Gen ATP Finals and Nitto ATP Finals, all Masters 1000 tournaments, 5 ATP 500 tournaments and 7 ATP 250 tournaments. From 13 January 2021 until 24 March of the same year, the channel is renamed as Sky Sport America's Cup, with 24 hours a day dedicated the 2021 America's Cup.

Sky Sport Action
Sky Sport Action, available since July 1, 2021 is a channel dedicated to motorsports, e.g. DTM and Porsche Carrera Cup but also other sports aired by Sky Italy, as rugby and wrestling.

Sky Sport NBA
Sky Sport NBA is the channel dedicated to the American basketball competitions.These are Sky Sport's basketballing rights used by this channel:
 NBA (until 2023) 
 WNBA (until 2022)

Sky Sport F1
This channel, for motor-car racing, uses rights given by the FIA including these events:
Classes (Formulas)
F1 (until 2022) 
F2 (until 2022) 
F3 (until 2022) 
Cups
Porsche Supercup (until 2022) 
Porsche Carrera Cup (until 2021)

Sky Sport MotoGP
This channel, for motorcycle racing, uses rights given by the FIM including these events:
Moto
MotoGP (until 2025) 
Moto2 (until 2025) 
Moto3 (until 2025) 
MotoE (until 2025) 
Other
CEV (until 2022) 
CIV (until 2021)
World SBK (until 2025) 
World SSP (until 2025) 
SSP 300 (until 2025)

References

External links
Sky Sport on sky.it 

Sky Italia
Italian-language television stations
Television channels in Italy
Sports television in Italy
Sports television networks
Television channels and stations established in 2003